Yukuben, or Uhumghikgi (Uhum), is a Plateau language of Nigeria. There are a thousand speakers across the border in Cameroon, where the name Uhumghikgi is preferred. It is a local trade language.

References

Yukubenic languages
Languages of Nigeria
Languages of Cameroon